This is a partial discography of Das Rheingold, the first of the four operas that comprise Der Ring des Nibelungen (The Ring of the Nibelung), by Richard Wagner.

The length of the Ring cycle meant that in the pre-LP days (before 1948) recordings from the Ring operas were largely confined to excerpts. In 1929 Franz von Hoesslin and the Walther Staram Concert Orchestra issued recorded excerpts from Das Rheingold on five 78rpm discs. The first recording of the complete Rheingold was taken from a New York Metropolitan Opera production in 1937, with Artur Bodanzky conducting. Most of the recordings that followed it were also taken from live performances, often from the Bayreuth Festival. The first studio recording was that of Georg Solti with the Vienna Philharmonic in 1958 – part of Solti's Ring cycle recording which was not completed until 1966.


Recordings
The table below is arranged by date of recording; issue dates were often many years after the recording itself. Some of the items have been subject to multiple reissues; generally, recording label details relate to currently available CD versions.

References

Opera discographies
Der Ring des Nibelungen
Operas by Richard Wagner